Dean Paul Martin Jr. (born Dino Paul Crocetti Jr., November 17, 1951 – March 21, 1987) was an American pop singer and film and television actor. A member of the California Air National Guard, Martin died in a crash during a military training flight. Martin was the son of entertainer Dean Martin.

Early life and career
Martin's parents were singer and entertainer Dean Martin and his second wife, Jeanne Biegger. Dean Paul was the fifth of Dean Martin's eight children, and was Jeanne's eldest son. He attended the Urban Military Academy in Brentwood, California. As a youth, Martin was encouraged toward a singing career. At age 13, he joined Desi Arnaz Jr. and Billy Hinsche in the pop group Dino, Desi & Billy, which had a few minor hits in the US in 1965, landing in the Billboard top 30 twice; "I'm a Fool" (U.S. #17) and "Not the Lovin' Kind" (U.S. #25).

Martin began to go by his given name of Dean Paul instead of the nickname "Dino" in his late teens. He became a successful tennis player (he competed in the qualifying competition at Wimbledon) and an actor. He co-starred with Ali MacGraw in the 1979 film Players, starring as a professional tennis player, for which he was nominated for a Golden Globe Award as New Star of the Year – Actor. He later starred in the TV series Misfits of Science which aired during the 1985-1986 television season. The series co-starred Courteney Cox.

His final film appearance came in Backfire, co-starring Karen Allen and Keith Carradine, released in 1988 after Martin's death.

Aviation career and death
Martin, an avid pilot, obtained his pilot's license at age 16 and became an officer in the California Air National Guard in 1980. He entered active duty for officer training in the U.S. Air Force under the Palace Chase program (i.e., direct entry into the Air National Guard or Air Force Reserve), was commissioned as a second lieutenant, and completed Undergraduate Pilot Training at Columbus AFB, Mississippi, in 1981. Following transition training in the F-4 Phantom II jet fighter at Homestead AFB, Florida, in the 308TFS, he was assigned to the California Air National Guard's 196th Tactical Fighter Squadron, 163rd Tactical Fighter Group, at March AFB, California, flying the F-4C Phantom II as a Traditional (i.e., part-time) Air National Guardsman. He eventually rose to the rank of captain.
Martin died in 1987 when his F-4 departed March Air Force Base, California, on a routine training mission and crashed in California's San Bernardino Mountains during a snowstorm, killing him and his weapons systems officer, Captain Ramon Ortiz. He was 35 years old.

His remains were buried in the Los Angeles National Cemetery, a U.S. Department of Veterans Affairs cemetery in Los Angeles, California.

Personal life
Martin married actress Olivia Hussey in 1971. They had one child, Alexander, and divorced in 1978. He married Olympic gold medalist ice skater Dorothy Hamill in 1982, and they divorced in 1984. Martin also dated Candice Bergen and Tina Sinatra.

References

External links
 
 
 

1951 births
1987 deaths
Accidental deaths in California
American male television actors
American people of English descent
American people of Italian descent
American male pop singers
Aviators killed in aviation accidents or incidents in the United States
Burials at Los Angeles National Cemetery
People from Santa Monica, California
20th-century American male actors
20th-century American singers
20th-century American male singers
United States Air Force officers
Victims of aviation accidents or incidents in 1987
Dean Martin
American male tennis players
Tennis people from California